The Maonan people (Maonan: Anan, literally "local people") are one of the 56 ethnic groups officially recognized by the People's Republic of China. There are a total of 101,192 Maonan as of 2010, mostly living northern Guangxi and southern Guizhou in southern China.

The Maonan people's autonyms are ʔai1 na:n6  (a Maonan person), kjɔŋ5 na:n6 (the Maonan people). Their language is called va6 na:n6 (Lu 2008:33).

Language

Society
More than 80% of the Maonan share the same surname: Tan. Maonan with the surname Tan believe that they are descended from the old inhabitants of the province of Hunan that migrated to Guangxi and married Maonan women.  Other common surnames found in this ethnic group are: Lu (卢/盧), Liu (刘/劉), Shi (石), Tan (覃), Wei (韦/韋) and Yuan (袁).

The towns of the Maonan do not surpass more than 100 dwellings. Their towns are organized by clan. Their dwellings are very similar to those of the Zhuang; they are usually made up of two floors and constructed out of planks and clay. The upper floor is used as the living quarters while the lower one serves as a granary and stable.

Traditionally, the marriages were arranged by the parents when the future newlyweds are still children. Traditionally when a Maonan woman became a widow, the brother of her late husband took her as his wife.

During the funeral service, the children of the deceased had to "buy" water of a river to be able to wash the corpse. Before proceeding to the burial, the blood of a chicken was poured on the land to purify it and to bless the spirit of the dead person.

Cuisine
Maonan cuisine includes many pickled dishes, of which the most famous ones are known as the  sa:m1 səm3 ta5 ma:u6na:n6 (three-sour-middle-Maonan) "The Three Maonan Sour Dishes" (Lu 2008:47). These three dishes are:

na:n4 səm3 - pickled meat
zo5 fa:t7 - fermented soup
ʔɔŋ5 ʔwu:i5 - (dish preserved with) lime in an urn

Rice wine is also popular among the Maonan.

Religion
Traditional Maonan religion is both animistic and polytheistic, with heavy Taoist influences. Many deities and rituals are borrowed from Chinese folk religion. Important figures and deities are listed below (Lu 2008:51).

Kitchen God - for the family's welfare
God of Earth - for peaceful outdoor activities
General Li Guang - A historical figure from the Western Han Dynasty who is venerated as a protector of villages.
Shentu and Yulei - These two legendary figures protect homes from malevolent devils by feeding them to tigers. They are placed on front doors to ward off evil.
Thunder God
The Thunder Soldiers
Flower God
Guanyin
muŋ2 ku:n1  - an evil immortal
lu2 pa:n1 - a historical figure who was a master carpenter
lɔk8 gi:u2 - a legendary figure who was a bridge builder
ʔbi:u2 - Emperor Yao
sa:m3 ȵɔn2 - a religious figure
za4 wa:ŋ2 - the God of the Earth
ni4 fa:n1 su:i5 - the Goddess of Birth

Maonan household shrines are called ji:ŋ1 wa3 (Lu 2008:51). The shrine consists of a wooden plate on a wall facing the front entrance. Names of deities and family ancestors are written on the plate.

The Maonan people also perform a redemptive ritual called vɛ4 da:u4 in order to show gratitude to ni4 fa:n1 su:i5 (cf. Chinese: Wansui Niangniang 万岁娘娘, the birth goddess). During Maonan weddings, couples ask the birth goddess for fertility. After the couple has children, they thank the birth goddess by offering 26 animals (1 ox, 7 small pigs, and 19 chickens and ducks).

References

External links
 http://www.china.org.cn/e-groups/shaoshu/shao-maonan.htm (Chinese government site)

Ethnic groups officially recognized by China